The IAAF World Outdoor Meetings were an annual, global circuit of one-day outdoor track and field competitions organized by the International Association of Athletics Federations (IAAF). It was created in 2003 building upon the IAAF Grand Prix series held since 1985. The series incorporated four categories of competitions: the IAAF Golden League, IAAF Super Grand Prix, IAAF Grand Prix I and IAAF Grand Prix II. The reorganisation came with the introduction of the IAAF World Rankings system. Athletes scored points based on their performances at the series meetings and the highest scoring athletes in each event were invited to compete at the IAAF World Athletics Final. The series lasted only three years before being reorganised into the IAAF World Athletics Tour.

Prior to 2003, the IAAF Grand Prix had featured four levels (Golden League, Grand Prix I and II, and IAAF Permit Meetings) and an IAAF Grand Prix Final with a limited set of events. The World Outdoor Meetings series made the Permit Meetings defunct, with most such meetings being merged into the Grand Prix II level, introduced the Super Grand Prix as the secondary level of competition, and replaced the Grand Prix Final with the World Athletics Final.

Editions
A total of five meeting categories existed over the lifetime of the circuit:

 GL : IAAF Golden League
 SGP : IAAF Super Grand Prix
 GP : IAAF Grand Prix
 GP2 : IAAF Grand Prix II
 WAF : IAAF World Athletics Final

Key:

Meetings
The IAAF World Outdoor Meetings calendar remained mostly unchanged during its three years of existence. A total of 34 meetings were present for each season. The Qatar Athletic Super Grand Prix was added to the Super Grand Prix Level for the second and third years. The Helsinki Grand Prix was dropped from the Grand Prix category in 2004. The Adidas Oregon Track Classic was dropped from the Grand Prix II category in 2005. The Grand Prix II meeting Cena Slovenska - Slovak Gold was held in the first year only and was replaced by the Grande Premio Rio de Atletismo meet for the final two years.

Athletes received points based on their performances at the meetings on the circuit, with more points being given at the more prestigious and competitive competitions.

The 2003 Athens Grand Prix Tsiklitiria was held in Trikala and the 2004 meeting in Heraklion
The 2003 Brothers Znamensky Memorial was held in Tula, Russia

References

External links
IAAF World Athletics Tour

 
World Outdoor Meetings
Annual athletics series
Defunct athletics competitions
Recurring sporting events established in 2003
Recurring sporting events disestablished in 2005